DXSA-TV, channel 10, is a television station of Philippine television network Intercontinental Broadcasting Corporation. Its transmitter are located at City Heights, General Santos. This station is currently inactive.

See also
List of Intercontinental Broadcasting Corporation channels and stations

Television stations in General Santos
Intercontinental Broadcasting Corporation stations
Television channels and stations established in 1975